Being curious means being inquisitive and tending to investigate or explore, in the passive sense as strange, surprising, odd, or as a euphemism for erotic as in 'curious art'.

Curious may also refer to:

Music 
 "Curious" (Danny Fernandes song)
 "Curious" (Hayley Kiyoko song)
 "Curious" (Tony Yayo song)
 "Curious", a song by Fiestar
 "Curious", a song by Franz Ferdinand from Hits to the Head
 "Curious", a song by Momoland from Great!

Other uses 
Curious (fragrance), a women's fragrance from Elizabeth Arden, endorsed by Britney Spears
Bi-curious, a person curious for a relationship or sexual activity with a person of the sex they do not favor
Curious (My Hero Academia), a character in the manga series My Hero Academia

See also
 Curiosity (disambiguation)
 Curio (disambiguation)